Furthest Land (foaled 2005 in Kentucky) is an American Thoroughbred racehorse. Bred by Catherine Wills, Furthest Land is the first registered foal from the unraced mare, Flagrant, a daughter of Rahy. He was a former claimer for $35,000 who, under the ownership of Ken and Sarah Ramsey, won the 2009 Breeders' Cup Dirt Mile by 3/4 length over Ready's Echo and heavily favored Midshipman.

References

2005 racehorse births
Thoroughbred family 9-h
Racehorses bred in Kentucky
Racehorses trained in the United States
Breeders' Cup Dirt Mile winners